Rana Pohap Singh was the  Jat ruler of Dholpur  state in (1836) in Rajasthan, India. He was from Bamraulia gotra of Jats. He was elder son of Rana Kirat Singh and his successor. He ruled for nine months and died in 1836. After his death his younger brother Rana Bhagwant Singh ascended to the throne.

References
Dr. Ajay Kumar Agnihotri (1985) : "Gohad ke jaton ka Itihas" (Hindi)
Dr. Natthan Singh (2004) : "Jat Itihas"
Jat Samaj, Agra: October–November 2004
Dr. Natthan Singh (2005): Sujas Prabandh (Gohad ke Shasakon ki Veer gatha – by Poet Nathan), Jat Veer Prakashan Gwalior

Rulers of Dholpur state
1836 deaths
Year of birth unknown